Rulinlu is a station on Line 10 of the Chengdu Metro in China. It was opened on 27 December 2019.

References

Railway stations in Sichuan
Railway stations in China opened in 2019
Chengdu Metro stations